C.C. Smith (May 3, 1860? – October 1, 1924), a.k.a. Charles C. Smith, Charles A.C. Smith, and  Charlie Smith, was an African American boxer who claimed the status of being the World Colored Heavyweight Champ and was the first boxer recognized as such.

Biography
Smith was born in Macon, Georgia, likely into slavery,  and he and his mother moved north in 1865. His birth date is given as May 3, 1860, but since he supposedly did not begin boxing until he was 19 and claimed the title in 1876, the birth year likely is spurious. Some sources cite 1869 as the year his boxing career began, and others 1879, which would have been three years after he claimed the championship.

He began fighting as a bareknuckle boxer. The 5'11" Smith, whose moniker was "The Black Thunderbolt", fought as a heavyweight  out of Buffalo, New York. Bill Muldoon, his manager, said he was a great pugilist possessed of cunning and a terrific punch. He reportedly fought 225 bouts.

In 1891, he traveled with Muldoon's traveling carnival, where he boxed with future lightweight champ Joe Gans, who was beginning his career. Gans would become the first African American to hold a world's championship boxing title.

Smith killed a man in the ring. On October 24, 1894, Amos Theis died of injuries inflicted by Smith during a bout in Louisville, Kentucky.

In 1903, when he was in his forties or fifties, he fought and defeated the former British Heavyweight champ, 40-year-old Jem Smith,in Manchester, Lancashire, England via a knockout. He reportedly fought Colored Heavyweight Champ (and future world heavyweight champ) Jack Johnson in Minneapolis, Minnesota in 1906, but it was likely an exhibition or never occurred due to Smith's age.

Smith's official record is 39 wins (33 by knockout) against 14 losses (he was KO-ed nine times) and five draws. He also recorded one newspaper decision win.

He died on October 1, 1924.

Legacy

In 2020 award-winning author Mark Allen Baker published the first comprehensive account of The World Colored Heavyweight Championship, 1876-1937, with McFarland & Company, a leading independent publisher of academic & nonfiction books. This history traces the advent and demise of the Championship, the stories of the talented professional athletes who won it, and the demarcation of the color line both in and out of the ring.

For decades the World Colored Heavyweight Championship was a useful tool to combat racial oppression-the existence of the title as a leverage mechanism, or tool, used as a technique to counter a social element known as “drawing the color line.”

Professional boxing record

References

Boxers from Georgia (U.S. state)
Heavyweight boxers
African-American boxers
World colored heavyweight boxing champions
Sportspeople from Macon, Georgia
1860 births
1924 deaths
American male boxers
20th-century African-American people